György Balázs (born 24 July 1985) is a retired tennis player from Hungary. He played for the Hungarian Davis Cup team in 2010 and 2011 His younger brother Attila also tennis player, they won 5 ITF doubles title with together.

Future and Challenger finals

Singles: 7 (4–3)

Doubles 14 (9–5)

Davis Cup

Participations: (4–2)

   indicates the outcome of the Davis Cup match followed by the score, date, place of event, the zonal classification and its phase, and the court surface.

References

External links

1985 births
Living people
Hungarian male tennis players
Tennis players from Budapest
French Open junior champions
Grand Slam (tennis) champions in boys' doubles
20th-century Hungarian people
21st-century Hungarian people